Common brushtail possum
 Common ringtail possum
 Common opossum
 Common brushtail possum in New Zealand

See also 

 List of common household pests